Carter Henry Harrison IV (April 23, 1860 – December 25, 1953) was an American newspaper publisher and Democratic politician who served a total of five terms as mayor of Chicago (1897–1905 and 1911–1915) but failed in his attempt to become his party's presidential nominee in 1904. Descended from aristocratic Virginia families and the son of five-term Chicago mayor Carter Harrison Sr., this Carter Harrison (IV) became the first native Chicagoan elected its mayor.

Biography

Harrison was born on April 23, 1860, in Chicago.

He was a member of many organizations including the Freemasons, Knights Templar, Society of the Cincinnati, Sons of the Revolution, Sons of the American Revolution, Society of Colonial Wars, Veterans of Foreign Wars, American Legion, and the Military Order of the World Wars.

Like his father, Carter Harrison Sr., Harrison gained election to five terms as Chicago's mayor. Educated in Saxe-Altenburg, Germany, Harrison returned to Chicago to help his brother run the Chicago Times, which their father bought in 1891. He had been a practicing lawyer before joining his family in running the Chicago Times in 1891. Under the Harrisons the paper became a resolute supporter of the Democratic Party, and was the only local newspaper to support the Pullman strikers in the mid-1890s. Harrison served as the newspapers editor. He stopped working at the newspaper in 1895.

First mayoralty
Harrison was first elected mayor in the 1897 Chicago mayoral election. He would win election to three consecutive additional two-year terms in 1899, 1901, and 1903.

Harrison was sworn in as mayor on April 15, 1897.

Like his father, Harrison did not believe in trying to legislate morality. As mayor, Harrison believed that Chicagoans' two major desires were to make money and to spend it. During his administrations, Chicago's vice districts blossomed, and special maps were printed to enable tourists to find their way from brothel to brothel. The name of one Chicago saloon-keeper of the time supposedly entered the English language as a term for a strong or laced drink intended to render unconsciousness: Mickey Finn.

However, Harrison was seen as more of a reformer than his father, which helped him garner the middle class votes his father had lacked. One of Harrison's biggest enemies was Charles Yerkes, whose plans to monopolize Chicago's streetcar lines were vigorously attacked by the mayor. This was the beginning of the Chicago Traction Wars, which would become a major focus of his administration. During his final term in office, Harrison established the Chicago Vice Commission and worked to close down the Levee district, starting with the  Everleigh Club brothel on October 24, 1911.

Despite prolonged and damaging international press coverage blaming his lax municipal enforcement for the 602 lives lost in the Iroquois Theatre fire on December 30, 1903 (still the deadliest single-building fire in U.S. history), Harrison hoped to become the 1904 Democratic nominee for President of the United States. However, the nomination went to Alton B. Parker, who was soundly defeated by Theodore Roosevelt.

Harrison declined to seek a fifth consecutive mayoral term in 1905, and was succeeded by fellow Democrat Edward Fitzsimmons Dunne on April 10, 1905.

Between mayoralties
In 1907, attempting to stage a return to office, Harrison unsuccessfully challenged Dunne for the Democratic mayoral nomination.

Second mayoralty
In 1911, Harrison was elected to a four-year term as mayor. He as sworn-in for his fifth nonconsecutive term as mayor on April 17, 1911.

In 1914, Harrison convinced the city council to establish a Commission for the Encouragement of Local Art to purchase works of art by Chicago artists. Harrison personally purchased artwork from painters such as Victor Higgins and Walter Ufer.

Harrison sought a sixth overall term as mayor in 1915, but was defeated in the Democratic primary by Robert Sweitzer, who went on to lose the general election to Republican William Hale Thompson. Harrison was succeeded in office by Thompson on April 26, 1915.

In 1915, when Harrison left office, Chicago had essentially reached its modern size in land area, and had a population of 2,400,000; the city was moving inexorably into its status as a major modern metropolis. He and his father had collectively been mayors of the city for 21 of the previous 36 years.

Post-mayoralty
From 1933 through 1944, Harrison served as the Internal Revenue Service collector for district of Chicago, having been appointed to the position by president Franklin D. Roosevelt on July 28, 1933.

Harrison served as the president of a commission which advocated for local arts.

Harrison published two autobiographies. One of these, a memoir entitled Growing Up with Chicago, was published in 1944.

Harrison died on December 25, 1953, in Chicago at his Chicago apartment, and is buried in Graceland Cemetery.

His papers are held by Chicago's Newberry Library.

Ancestry and personal life
Harrison was a descendant of Robert Carter I, Benjamin Harrison IV, William Randolph, and Isham Randolph of Dungeness.

His wife, Edith Ogden Harrison, was a well-known writer of children's books and fairy tales in the first two decades of the 20th century.

In 1907 Harrison became a hereditary member of the Virginia Society of the Cincinnati.

References

External links
Mayor Carter Henry Harrison Papers  at the Newberry Library
 (previous page of browse report under 'Harrison, Carter H. (Carter Henry), 1825–1893')
Carter H. Harrison papers at The Newberry

1860 births
1953 deaths
American people of English descent
Burials at Graceland Cemetery (Chicago)
Carter family of Virginia
Carter Henry Jr.
Mayors of Chicago
Randolph family of Virginia
Illinois Democrats
American patrons of the arts
Yale Law School alumni
Tax collectors
Editors of Illinois newspapers